Giordano's is an American pizzeria chain that specializes in Chicago-style stuffed pizza. Brothers Efren and Joseph Boglio founded Giordano's in 1974 in Chicago, Illinois. The pizzeria has since expanded to over 65 locations in Arizona, Colorado, Florida, Indiana, Iowa, Minnesota, Ohio, Nevada, and Wisconsin. The chain has also expanded to offer catering and ship frozen pizzas in the United States.

History
Brothers Efren and Joseph Boglio were born in a small town near Turin, Italy, where their mother had been known for the quality of her recipes. Her family was most fond of her Easter pizza pies. The brothers first immigrated to Argentina and subsequently (separately) to the U.S. Upon arriving in America, Efren began working at a pizzeria in Chicago, but he was not satisfied with the pizzas he tasted and decided to open his own restaurant, Roma. When Joseph came to Chicago, Efren has stated they decided to open a restaurant using their mother's recipe and after experimenting over several months developed the stuffed pizza. In 1974, they founded Giordano's.

Challenges

Several commentators have questioned the restaurant's claim about the creation of the stuffed pizza, noting similarities with the origin story of Nancy's Pizza, which had introduced its own stuffed pizza in the same year. Both chains claim to have based the pizza off a family recipe for scarciedda, an Easter dish common to Basilicata and Apulia, two regions of Italy. Due to the similarities commentators have suggested there is a connection between the founders of the two pizza chains.

New ownership
John Apostolou, a native of Greece, together with his wife Eva, acquired Giordano's in 1988. In 1993 he told Crain's Chicago Business of their ambitions to expand the chain by opening over 100 new locations in the United States, Europe, and the Middle East. However, this desired expansion did not materialize. Under Apostolou's stewardship, Giordano's opened a restaurant in Milwaukee in 1995 and planned for five more, but the Milwaukee location closed in 2002. The first major expansion outside Illinois began in 2005 when Giordano's opened locations in Florida.

Bankruptcy and resale
Due to weak economic conditions, the Apostolou family faced difficulty in leasing and selling their commercial real estate properties. Their firm, Randolph Partners LLC, eventually defaulted on its real estate loans on January 1, 2011, and filed for Chapter 11 bankruptcy on February 8, 2011. Due to sharing the same primary lender, Giordano's was included in the proceedings along with over 30 affiliate companies. Overall, the companies listed nearly $50 million in combined liabilities to Fifth Third Bank and $2 million to two additional banks and were able to obtain emergency financing in order to stay in operation. While Giordano's entered bankruptcy at a time when many other restaurant chains and pizzerias were being forced to re-organize due to faltering sales, the company's bankruptcy attorney, Michael Gesas, assuaged concerns about the chain's viability and stated that real estate was the reason for the bankruptcy. 

After filing for bankruptcy, four restaurants closed as the result of the legal battles that occurred. John Apostolou complicated matters when he challenged the proceedings by filing pseudolegal documents that had been prepared by a sovereign citizen ideologue. The company's bankruptcy lawyer withdrew from the case as a result, and the bankruptcy court responded by barring Apostolou from entering the company's headquarters as well as any of its restaurants. John and Eva Apostolou eventually sold the business for $52 million to Chicago private-equity firm Victory Park Capital Advisors LLC. Ultimately, the firm — which was indebted for approximately $52 million — was auctioned off in November 2011 for $61.6 million to a group including private equity firms Victory Park, Origin Capital, and Atria Group, and George and Bill Apostolou (the sons of John and Eva Apostolou, who owned Giordano's prior to bankruptcy.)

Locations

Prior to filing for bankruptcy, Giordano's  had 13 restaurants in Chicago and another 30 locations in the Chicago metropolitan area.  The firm opened its first locations outside of Illinois in northern and central Florida in 2005. Early Florida locations were opened in Lake Buena Vista and Kissimmee.  By October 2007, Giordano's had opened stores in Port Richey, Brandon, and Tampa. In February 2015, Giordano's opened a new restaurant in Indianapolis. The official opening date was February 3, 2015. This is the second Indiana location for Giordano's with the first Indiana location in Merrillville. In July 2015, Giordano's made its entry into the Minnesota market, opening a restaurant in the Uptown area of Minneapolis. Today there are a total of about 40+ stores in the Chicago area, and some located elsewhere. There are three locations which are franchisee, located in Florida. They plan to open new locations in Carmel, Indiana, Andersonville, Navy Pier, Vernon Hills, Matteson, and Beavercreek, Ohio. On April 12, 2018, it was announced that Omaha, Nebraska would be the recipient of a Giordano's pizzeria. Omaha won a contest conducted by Giordanos in November 2017 to see which city would be the next to open a Giordano's. Omaha beat out Dallas, Des Moines, Cincinnati, and Houston. After much fanfare and attention from Omaha there was a controversy as it appeared that Giordanos had backed out of its promise which created a massive backlash in Omaha. This caused Giordanos to seriously consider Omaha. On April 12, 2018, the marketing manager for Giordanos announced on Twitter and Facebook "We are definitely coming". The executive team has been scouting locations.

As of January 2020, outside of Illinois, Giordano's has locations in Arrowhead, AZ, Denver, CO, Kissimmee/Celebration, FL, Lake Buena Vista/Disney Area, FL, Sand Lake/Universal Studios, FL, Fort Wayne, IN, Greenwood, IN, Castleton, IN, Indianapolis, IN, Schererville, IN, West Des Moines, IA, Richfield, MN, Minneapolis, MN, Beavercreek, OH, Canton, OH, Columbus, OH, Boca Park, NV, Las Vegas, NV and Kenosha, WI.

Competition
Giordano's is one of the most famous of Chicago's pizzerias, and its major competitors in the Chicago-style deep dish field are Pizzeria Uno, Nancy's, Gino's East, Pizano's, and Lou Malnati's, while its thin crust pizza competes primarily with Home Run Inn, Connie's, Aurelio's and Rosati's. Along with Uno and Gino's, Giordano's has been described as one of Chicago's "main pizza triumvirate".

Fare
The stuffed pizza at Giordino's has a top and bottom crust with cheese stuffed in between and the option of additional toppings in the middle such as pepperoni, Italian sausage, and spinach, while sauce and parmesan are added on top of the crust. Giordano's pizza crust is made from dough high in gluten, which takes several days to prepare. The crust has been described as being soft and flaky, while not having much flavor, with the shape being in the traditional Chicago-style.

Reception

Giordano's stuffed pizza has received wide acclaim from critics, being named "Best Pizza in the City" by Chicago Magazine and "Best Pizza in America" by NBC's The Today Show. On Serious Eats, Daniel Zemans, praised the sauce used in the stuffed pizza for having a strong tomato and herb flavor, while noting the crust as a less enthusing yet suitable element of the pizza. Denise Du Vernay, in a review of several Chicago-area pizzerias for Patch.com, described the stuffed pizza at Giordano's as "perfect" and superior to the stuffed pizza offered at Aurelio's Pizza. In an article for the Christian Science Monitor, Giordano's was listed at fourth in a ranking of pizzerias in the Chicago area, with the article praising its stuffed pizza. The Rough Guide to Chicago said in 2003, "Although most pizza parlors offer deep-dish, the following places have perfected it: Pizzeria Uno, Lou Malnati's ..., and Giordano's." One criticism raised about the pizza is the time it takes for the pizza to cook, with a stuffed pizza having an average preparation time of up to 45 minutes. Diners can shorten this waiting period by ordering ahead or taking a half-baked pizza so they can finish baking it in their home oven. Giordano's was voted "Chicago's Best Pizza" by NBC, CBS Chicago, New York Times, Chicago Tribune, Chicago Magazine, Chicago Eater and Home & Garden Magazine.

References

External links

 

Pizza chains of the United States
Restaurants in Chicago
Regional restaurant chains in the United States
Companies that filed for Chapter 11 bankruptcy in 2011
Restaurants established in 1974
Italian restaurants in the United States
1974 establishments in Illinois